Burgoyne is a surname introduced to England following the Norman conquest of 1066, which denoted someone from Burgundy (Bourgogne in French). Notable people with the name include:

Alan Burgoyne (1880–1929), British soldier, politician and writer
Burgoyne Diller (1906–1965), American abstract painter
Grant Burgoyne (1953), Boise, Idaho attorney and a Democratic State Senator representing Idaho's District
Harry Burgoyne (1996), English footballer
Hugh Talbot Burgoyne (1833–1870), Irish Royal Naval officer, VC winner and son of John Fox Burgoyne
Jacqueline Burgoyne (1944–1988), British sociologist and academic
James Patrick Montagu Burgoyne Winthrop Stopford, 9th Earl of Courtown (b. 1954), British peer and politician
John Burgoyne (1722–1792), British general during the American Revolutionary War, father of John Fox Burgoyne
John Fenwick Burgoyne Blackett (1821–1856), British politician
John Fox Burgoyne (1782–1871), British field marshal of the British Army, son of John Burgoyne, father of Hugh Talbot Burgoyne
Mike Burgoyne (rugby union) (1951–2016), New Zealand rugby union player
Mike Burgoyne (born 1978), Canadian ice hockey player
Mindie Burgoyne, American writer and businessperson
Montagu Burgoyne (1750–1836), British politician.
Patrick Burgoyne, New Zealand rugby league footballer of the 1980s
Peter Burgoyne (b. 1978), Australian rules footballer, brother of Shaun Burgoyne
Peter Bond Burgoyne (1844–1929), English wine merchant
Shaun Burgoyne (b. 1982), Australian rules footballer, brother of Peter Burgoyne
Thomas Burgoyne (cricketer, born 1775) (1775–1847), British cricketer
Thomas Burgoyne (Australian politician) (1827–1920), South Australian politician
Thomas Henry Burgoyne, secretary and member of the Hermetic Brotherhood of Luxor and author of The Light in Egypt, published in 1889.
Victoria Burgoyne (b. 1965), British actress
William Burgoyne Taverner (1879–1958), New Zealand politician

See also
Burgoyne baronets, from two British baronetcies
Bourgoin (surname)
Burgoyne, Ontario for Burgoyne Village

References